The Minister for Just Transition, Employment and Fair Work is a junior ministerial post in the Scottish Government that was created in May 2021. As a result, the minister does not attend the Scottish Cabinet, but supports the Cabinet Secretary for Finance and the Economy and Cabinet Secretary for Net Zero, Energy and Transport, who both attend the cabinet.

The current and inaugural Minister for Just Transition, Employment and Fair Work is Richard Lochhead.

Overview

Responsibilities 
Specific responsibilities of the Minister for  Just Transition, Employment and Fair Work are:

 Just Transition planning and delivery, including the work of the Just Transition Commission
 co-ordination of Sectoral Just Transition plans and monitoring framework
 long-term labour market strategy, the living wage
 Fair Work
 PACE
 employability programmes
 women's employment
 cities investment and strategy
 green growth accelerator
 inclusive growth
 trade unions
 green skills/jobs for the future
 low-carbon economy

List of office holders

See also
Scottish Parliament

References

Public Finance and Digital Economy
Economy of Scotland
Finance ministers of Scotland
Economy ministers
Public finance of Scotland
Scotland